Raphael Mangouala is a Gabonese politician. He is the current National Secretary in charge of Territorial Administration, Defense, Security, Immigration, and Foreign Affairs and Cooperation of the ruling Gabonese Democratic Party (Parti démocratique gabonais, PDG).

References

Gabonese Democratic Party politicians
Living people
Year of birth missing (living people)
Government ministers of Gabon
21st-century Gabonese people